Leslie Dale Eaves is an American politician. He served as a Republican member for the 46th district of the Arkansas House of Representatives.

Eaves attended the Colorado State University, where he earned his degree in business administration. He also attended at the University of Texas at Arlington. Eaves worked as a real estate agent. He served as the vice president of the Delta Manufacturing, Inc.

In 2015, Eaves was elected to represent the 46th district of the Arkansas House of Representatives, succeeding Mark Biviano. Eaves took office on January 12, 2015.

As of 2022, Eaves is a candidate for the 58th district of the Arkansas House of Representatives. He tested positive for the COVID-19.

References 

Living people
Place of birth missing (living people)
Year of birth missing (living people)
Republican Party members of the Arkansas House of Representatives
21st-century American politicians
American real estate brokers
Colorado State University alumni
University of Texas at Arlington alumni